The M33 road is a short metropolitan route in the City of Tshwane in Gauteng, South Africa. It consists of only one road (January Masilela Drive) in Pretoria East, connecting Constantia Park with Lynnwood Ridge.

Route 
The M33 begins at a junction with the M10 route (Solomon Mahlangu Drive) in Constantia Park. It begins by heading northwards as January Masilela Drive (formerly Gen Louis Botha Drive) through the Constantia Park suburb before entering the Waterkloof Glen suburb and meeting the M30 route (Garsfontein Road) adjacent to the Waterglen Shopping Centre. The M33 continues northwards, separating the Menlyn suburb in the west from the Garsfontein suburb in the east, to reach a junction with the M11 route (Atterbury Road). Still named January Masilela Drive, the M33 continues northwards, bypassing the Faerie Glen Nature Reserve, to reach its end at a junction with the M6 route (Lynnwood Road) in Lynnwood Ridge.

References 

Metropolitan Routes in Pretoria